The Lotus 101 was the car with which the Lotus team competed in the 1989 Formula One World Championship. It was powered by a Judd V8 engine and driven by triple World Champion Nelson Piquet and Satoru Nakajima, in their second and third seasons with the team respectively.

Overview
Gérard Ducarouge's departure during 1988 had necessitated the former Williams aerodynamicist Frank Dernie to be appointed as Technical Director in November 1988. Despite his appointment the majority of the work for the 101 had been conducted by chief designer Mike Coughlan. The 101 was to be a rushed design built within weeks and to a series of constraints.

Ducarouge's departure coincided with end of the 1,500 cc turbocharged era. Lotus, along with other competitors, now had to incorporate 3,500 cc normally aspirated engines into their cars. Judd were therefore enlisted to supply their CV 32 valve V8 engine, but as Lotus were only a "customer" (Judd's principal contracts were the supply of their latest EV V8 engines to the Brabham and March teams) solutions were sought to make up the power deficiency by appointing Tickford to research and develop a version of the Judd engine with a five-valve-per-cylinder head. The use of the Judd engine did permit Dernie and Coughlan to design a smaller and lighter car than before; indeed the narrowness of the cockpit required Momo to build a special steering wheel to allow the drivers to fit their hands between the wheel and bodywork of the car.

The initial optimism and favourable reception by management and driver alike shortly evaporated, as the 101 proved to be a disaster.

The 101 failed to collect significant results as the season progressed, culminating in the events following the British Grand Prix where Nelson Piquet had driven to a fighting fourth-placed finish. The Chapman family, who were still the shareholders in Team Lotus International, persuaded Peter Warr and Chairman Fred Bushell (who was about to face charges arising from the DeLorean affair) to leave. Tony Rudd, who was at the time working for Group Lotus, was appointed executive chairman. Also the Tickford head was abandoned.

The renewed optimism briefly helped to improve results; however, at Spa both Lotuses failed to qualify for a Grand Prix for the first time since 1958. The season ended with two fourth-place finishes for Nelson Piquet and Satoru Nakajima in Japan and Australia respectively. Nakajima also snatched the fastest lap in the torrential rain of Adelaide.

Given the dreadful start to the season (Lotus only scored points in one of the first seven races), the total points tally of 15 points was almost a positive Lotus could take out of the 1989 season. Indeed, it would prove to be the highest number of points Lotus were to score in a season during the normally aspirated engine era until the team's collapse at the end of the 1994 season.

Complete Formula One results
(key) (Results in italics indicate fastest lap)

References

101